Styggehøi is a mountain on the border of Vågå Municipality and Lom Municipality in Innlandet county, Norway. The mountain is surrounded by several other notable mountains including Austre Hestlægerhøe and Vestre Hestlægerhøe to the east, Glittertinden to the north, Veotinden and Veobreahesten to the east, and Surtningssue to the southwest.

See also
List of mountains of Norway

References

Lom, Norway
Vågå
Mountains of Innlandet